Sun Red Sun is an EP by American rock band Lynch Mob. It was written and recorded by George Lynch, Oni Logan, Robbie Crane and Scot Coogan.  It is the band's third album with Rat Pack Records.

Track listing

Personnel 
Oni Logan – lead vocals
George Lynch – lead guitar
Robbie Crane – bass, backing vocals
Scot Coogan – drums, backing  vocals

References

External links 
 

Lynch Mob (band) albums
2014 EPs